Events in the year 2017 in Fiji.

Incumbents
President: George Konrote
Prime Minister: Frank Bainimarama

Events

Deaths

15 January – Jimmy Snuka, professional wrestler and actor (b. 1943).

21 June – Udit Narayan, politician (b. 1960)

References

 
2010s in Fiji
Years of the 21st century in Fiji
Fiji
Fiji